Peleus is a hero in Greek mythology.

Peleus may also refer to:
In-Q-Tel, formerly Peleus, American  not-for-profit venture capital firm
Mount Peleus, mount in Victoria Land, Antarctica
Saint Peleus, Christian martyr
SS Peleus, Greek ship
Peleus, a synonym for Entheus, a genus of butterflies